The 2015 Buffalo Funds - NAIA Division I men's basketball tournament was held in March at Municipal Auditorium in Kansas City, Missouri. The 78th annual NAIA basketball tournament featured 32 teams playing in a single-elimination format. 2015 tournament would bring four new teams to the NAIA national semifinals. The first tournament since 2005 tournament to do so. (It would be the 8th time in tournament history this has happened; previous years were the inaugural year 1937, 1945, 1947, 1965, 1969, 2001, 2005). As of 2018, it is the most recent tournament to do so.

2015 awards
Most consecutive tournament appearances: 24th, Georgetown (KY)
Most tournament appearances: 34th, Georgetown (KY)

Bracket

 denotes overtime

See also
2015 NAIA Division I women's basketball tournament
2015 NCAA Division I men's basketball tournament
2015 NCAA Division II men's basketball tournament
2015 NCAA Division III men's basketball tournament
2015 NAIA Division II men's basketball tournament

References

NAIA Men's Basketball Championship
Tournament
NAIA Division I men's basketball tournament
NAIA Division I men's basketball tournament